Wangbangsan is a mountain in Gyeonggi-do, South Korea. It lies between the cities of Pocheon and Dongducheon.

See also
 List of mountains in Korea

Notes

References
 

Mountains of South Korea
Mountains of Gyeonggi Province